Charlotte Glasson (born 1 March 1973, London, England) is a British multi-instrumentalist, bandleader, composer and session player, playing soprano, alto, tenor and baritone saxophone, flute, alto flute, piccolo, clarinet, bass clarinet, violin and viola, penny whistle, melodica, percussion, and saw.

Early life
Charlotte started playing the violin at the age of five, got a guitar when she was seven and taught herself how to play Beatle tunes, and then got a saxophone for Christmas when she was 12.
Charlotte went on to study Music at Kingston University, after which she progressed into a career as a session musician, bandleader and composer/arranger.

Career 
Glasson plays jazz, classical music, blues, soul, funk, Latin, country and everything in between. She has composed music for an Art Installation at The Ashmolean Museum in Oxford with Chinese Artist Qu Leilei, and music for theatre performances by George Dillon. She leads the Charlotte Glasson Band, who perform her compositions along with those of the band. Glasson is also part of the band of Camille O'Sullivan.
She is a member of Three Friends, a progressive rock band who perform the music of Gentle Giant, and is a regular of the cast for The Lost and Found Orchestra.

Bands and solo artist discography 
as Charlotte Glasson / Charlotte Glasson Band
 Escapade (2005)
 Travels with Charlotte Glasson (2008)
 Charlotte’s World Wide Web (2010)
 Playground (2011)
 Live (2012)
 Festivus (2014)
 Robots (2018)
 Bonito (2022)

other projects
 Que Pasa: Glass Blower (2004) – Latin Jazz with Chris Kibble on piano, Quentin Collins on trumpet, and Adam Riley on drums
 Lazy Days (2005) – with Jez Tonkin
 Shadow Dance (2009) – with Dan Hewson
 Tritones – with Sam Arts and Sam Glasson (2009)
 Camille Sings Cave Live - Camille O'Sullivan Camille O'Sullivan (2019)

as a session musician
 Barry Adamson – Know Where To Run
 James Blackshaw – All Is Falling, Holly EP, Fantomas
 Nick Cave and The Bad Seeds - Skeleton Tree
 The Divine Comedy – Casanova, A Short Album About Love, Fin de Siècle, Victory for the Comic Muse, Bang Goes the Knighthood
 Andy Mackay – 3Psalms
 Claire Martin – Take My Heart, Perfect Alibi
 Oasis – Standing on the Shoulder of Giants
 Nerina Pallot – The Graduate
 Chris Spedding – Pearls, Joyland
 UNKLE – "The Knock on Effect"
 Jah Wobble – Fly

Film and television work
 Raw – composer Jim Williams – viola
One More Time with Feeling – viola
 A Field in England – composer Jim Williams – viola
 Danger Mouse – composer Sanj Sen – soprano, alto, tenor, baritone sax, flute and alto flute
 Moshi Monsters: The Movie – composer – Sanj Sen – bass clarinet, clarinet, flute, alto flute, piccolo
 Bad Girls – appearing in the TV series 2 and 3 – tenor sax
 A Mother 's Son – composer Daniel Pemberton – viola
 Money – composer Daniel Pemberton – tenor and alto sax
 Vanity Fair – composer Murray Gold – baritone sax
 Desperate Romantics – composer Daniel Pemberton – baritone sax
 PG-Tips advert- Joby Talbot – baritone sax 
 Young Musician of the Year theme Joby Talbot – soprano sax
 Tomorrows World theme – composer Neil Hannon/Joby Talbot – flute sax
 Ice Road Truckers – composer Daniel Pemberton – flute viola sax

Compositions and arrangements 
Theatre plays by George Dillon:
 Graft
 Hell and other stories
 The Gospel of Matthew
 The man who was Hamlet
 Hamlet

Everyone's Life is an Epic, an art installation at the Ashmolean Museum in Oxford with Chinese Artist Qu Leilei.

References

External links 
 
 
 

Living people
British women composers
British multi-instrumentalists
Women musical theatre composers
1973 births
Musicians from London